MIL-53 (MIL ⇒ Matériaux de l′Institut Lavoisier) belongs to the class of metal-organic framework (MOF) materials. The first synthesis and the name was established by the group of Gérard Férey in 2002. The MIL-53 structure consists of inorganic [M-OH] chains, which are connected to four neighboring inorganic chains by therephthalate-based linker molecules. Each metal center is octahedrally coordinated by six oxygen atoms. Four of these oxygen atoms originate from four different carboxylate groups and the remaining two oxygen atoms belong to two different μ-OH moieties, which bridge neighboring metal centers. The resulting framework structure contains one-dimensional diamond-shaped pores. Many research group have investigated the flexibility of the MIL-53 structure. This flexible behavior, during which the pore cross-section changes reversibly, was termed 'breathing.effect' and describes the ability of the MIL-53 framework to respond to external stimuli.

Structural Analogs

Monometallic single-linker MIL-53 analogs
MIL-53(Cr) was the first reported member of the MIL-53 family and is built up from Cr3+ as metal center and terephthalate (benzene-1,4-dicarboxylate) as linker molecules. Based on the toolbox-like design of metal-organic framework materials, different metal centers or linker molecules can be used for the synthesis of other members of the MIL-53 family. Trivalent (M3+) metal centers are mainly used, but materials with divalent (M2+) or tetravalent (M4+) metals have also been published. 

Terephthalate was used as linker molecules in the early reports on MIL-53 materials. Later, terephthalate-based linker molecules with additional functional groups were used for the synthesis of functionalized MIL-53 materials. Apart from the two carboxylate groups of terephthalate, which are used for the formation of the framework structure, the functional linker molecules contain one or more functional groups at the benzene ring, which do not participate in the formation of the framework.

Mixed-component MIL-53 analogs 
Apart from monometallic single-linker MIL-53 analogs, which contain one type of metal and one type of linker within the framework structure, several mixed-component MIL-53 analogs were reported. In mixed-metal MIL-53 materials, two different metals are incorporated into the framework structure at crystallographically equivalent lattice positions. Since both type of metals occupy equivalent positions, the metal ratio can usually be changed independent from the framework structure. Mixed-metal MIL-53 analogs have been synthesized mainly by direct synthesis procedures under hydrothermal or solvothermal conditions. 

Similar to mixed-metal MIL-53 materials, mixed-linker MIL-53 analogs have been reported, in which two different linker molecules are incorporated into the framework structure at crystallographically equivalent positions with different ratios. One benefit of using the mixed-linker concept is that the number of functional groups in the framework can be adjusted by using different linker ratios.

References 

Flexible metal-organic frameworks